Jan Pouwer (21 September 1924, Dordrecht – 21 April 2010, Zwolle) was a Dutch anthropologist with a thorough grounding in his profession in terms of fieldwork and theory. He studied Indology and Ethnology at Leiden University (MA 1950, PhD 1955) under the renowned Jan Petrus Benjamin de Josselin de Jong. He worked as a ‘government anthropologist’ and conducted extensive fieldwork in Netherlands New Guinea (now Papua region in Indonesia), 1951–62. He subsequently served as Professor of Anthropology at Amsterdam, Wellington (N.Z./Aotearoa) and Nijmegen Universities, 1962–87.

Many of his concerns and much of his work can be viewed as a 'text' framed within the 'context' of Leiden Structuralism, itself part of the larger field of modern anthropology. He enriched this field with insights in configurational comparison and the dialectical character of social structure, mythology, gender and ritual. A dedicated teacher, Pouwer's ideas are not to be found in a single volume. They exist, like some forms of mythology, in several outlines and sketches. Over the course of his career, Pouwer published two books (one his 1955 PhD thesis) and a wide range of articles. His last book, Gender, Ritual and Social Formation in West Papua: A Configurational Analysis Comparing Kamoro and Asmat, was published at Leiden in 2010. It can be downloaded from OAPEN for no cost.

Professional career

Pouwer studied Indology and Ethnology at Leiden University (first degree July 1, 1947; second degree November 14, 1950), a study leading to an academic degree for the Netherlands Indies Public Administration that included: Malayan and Javanese languages, Comparative Ethnology of the Netherlands Indies, Islamic Institutions, Overseas History, Constitutional and Customary Law, Western and Non-Western Economics, Cultural Anthropology. He worked briefly as a lecturer at Utrecht University (1951), then took off on a career as a ‘government anthropologist’ in Netherlands New Guinea, 1951–62.

He obtained his PhD on anthropological fieldwork among the Mimika in the Netherlands New Guinea at Leiden in 1955. He was a research officer (gouvernmentsethnoloog) at the Bureau for Native Affairs (Kantoor voor Bevolkingszaken) in Hollandia (now Jayapura), Netherlands New Guinea, 1951–60; served as Acting Advisor for Native Affairs in 1960–1961, as Advisor for Native Affairs in 1962.

He conducted fieldwork among the Kamoro people in the coastal Mimika-area (South-West New Guinea), 1951–54; undertook a two-months’ survey on social structure, land-tenure, prestige economy and some moot problems of acculturation in the areas surrounding the Ajamaru lakes, Central Bird's Head, West New Guinea, 1956; six months of research into the effects of commercial films on the ideas, values and behavior of urban Papuans, 1956; four months of fieldwork in the rugged highlands of the Northwestern Bird's Head (Anggi lakes and surroundings), mainly among two highly dispersed tribes, 1957; eight months of fieldwork as a member of the Dutch scientific expedition to the Star Mountains (Sterrengebergte) near the border between West New Guinea and Papua, 1959; the Iwur region, south of the Star Mountains; the urban community of Tugunese people (1961), a mixture of Indonesian, Portuguese, Dutch, German and Papuan origin, who left their village near Jakarta in 1950 to settle in Hollandia (now Jayapura) and who were expected to migrate to the Netherlands in 1962.

His 1955 PhD thesis at Leiden, Enkele aspecten van de Mimika-cultuur, Nederlands Zuidwest Nieuw Guinea (Some aspects of Mimika Culture, Netherlands South-West New Guinea), was based on twenty-five months of fieldwork among the Mimika (Kamoro) people. Pouwer makes frequent reference to it in many of his published papers. In the Prologue to his 2010 book, he notes (2010:3) that a request to have the thesis translated into English was unsuccessful and that this reduced access for those with a limited reading knowledge of Dutch.

Shortly before his death, Pouwer concluded a synthetic monograph comparing Kamoro and Asmat culture, based on his own fieldwork, missionary and administrative reports, and anthropological studies (Gender, Ritual and Social Formation in West Papua. Leiden, 2010). In this work Pouwer makes use of a distinction between the symbolic and existential dimensions of social action as refined by Bruce Knauft (1993) while, at the same time and contra Knauft, using a configurational approach to demonstrate the difference between the neighbouring Kamoro and Asmat peoples.

Teaching experience: as part of his official duties Pouwer taught general anthropology and ethnography of New Guinea at the School of Public Administration (Bestuursschool) in Hollandia, Netherlands New Guinea, 1955–58. He was Full Professor of Cultural Anthropology, Faculty of Social and Political Sciences, University of Amsterdam, The Netherlands, 1962–66; Foundation Professor and Head of the Department of Anthropology and Maori Studies, Victoria University of Wellington, New Zealand, 1966–76; and Senior Lecturer, Department of Cultural and Social Anthropology, Catholic University of Nijmegen, The Netherlands, 1976–87. He was a visiting professor at Monash University (Australia) in 1971 and at the Universities of Toronto (Canada), Leiden and Utrecht (the Netherlands) in 1972.

General Overview

One theme which runs through Pouwer's work, both published and unpublished, is the need for new approaches to understanding the social formations of other peoples. In his work he was always aware of a dialectical relationship, in terms of systems of significations, between the anthropologist as an observer and the lived realities of other peoples.

There was never any easy resting place for dogma in Pouwer's teaching. He not only embraced paradox and contradiction as necessary features of knowledge, he also emphasized the ongoing dialectical movement from doubt to certainty to doubt ...

His New Guinea experiences lead him to seriously question the use of descent-based anthropological models developed in Africa. Characterising descent as a vertical form of arrangement, Pouwer noted that "... the structural importance of the horizontal arrangement of kin has been neglected." (Pouwer 1967:92) He added that, without taking "...the horizontal arrangement into explicit consideration ... the structure of New Guinea systems will not be intelligible to us."(ibid)

Pouwer's work also demonstrates a consistent attempt to capture, within a strict discipline, something of life's movement. This tension in his work may have resulted from his immersion in New Guinea lived realities and the lack of fit between those realities and Western understanding. Possibly for this reason Pouwer did not embrace a purely structuralist position à la Lévi-Strauss.

Pouwer was a foremost advocate of a configurational approach for cross-cultural comparison with an emphasis on the importance of 'relative position' of elements within an arrangement rather than on elements themselves. Pouwer's configurational approach has a synchronic aspect (comparison between cultures) and a diachronic aspect which (following Lévi-Strauss) he called 'structural history'.

The configurational approach to cross-cultural comparison may also be viewed against other attempts such as those of structural functionalism, which dealt with institutions and functions.

Some of the other themes which ran through his teaching (during his years in Wellington, New Zealand-Aotearoa) do not appear strongly in his published work. These include an emphasis on complementary opposition and a both-and approach (in comparison to an either/or logic).

Other themes range from a review of Dutch New Guinea as an Ethnological Field of Study (1961) to a 'travel guide' to the myths of Kamoro and Asmat peoples (2002). In the latter, Pouwer brings an anthropological perspective spanning some fifty years to materials collected by others including Dutch missionaries such as Father G. A. Zegwaard.

Field of Study

Pouwer's deep concern with questions regarding cross-cultural comparison (and avoiding the comparison of incomparables) was related to the Leiden School's tradition as well as to the theoretical problems of general anthropology. The role played by J.P.B. de Josselin de Jong's idea of  "Field of Ethnological Study"  (later, under P.E. de Josselin de Jong,  "Field of Anthropological Study" FAS) leads to questions of how to compare and contrast different socio-cultural formations within an area deemed to constitute a field of study. In place of typologies of cultures or simple comparison of 'elements' Pouwer asserted that a concern for 'relative position' of elements is a fundamental structuralist tenet.

Pouwer's work demonstrated a Leiden FAS concern for socio-cosmic aspects including dualism and First Peoples' (indigenous) cosmology. He wrote about New Guinea as a field of ethnographic study in 1961 and revisited the topic in 1992.

Configurational Approach

In addition to his 1960s article on a configurational approach, Pouwer spelled out more of his understanding of configurations in 1974. There Pouwer put forward structuring principles which can "...form a system of relations, a configuration ...". These include two complementary basic structuring principles: (a) Identical positioning, and (b) Contra-positioning. There are three derived general structuring principles: (c) Reciprocal positioning, (d) Equi-positioning, (e) Supra-positioning. To these are added the derived particular structuring principles: (f) vertical positioning, (g) Horizontal positioning, and (h) Concentric positioning. (Pouwer 1974:241-242)

In his 2010 book Pouwer said:

"By 'configuration' I mean a process that turns elements into components arranged and imbued with meaning by a central orientation...Both configuration and orientation can be conceived of as always being on the move, never closed, always open to change, ambivalence and contradiction. A configuration approach assumes a central orientation that permeates a particular society and culture." (Pouwer 2010:7-8)

Descent versus Siblingship 

Pouwer's fieldwork in New Guinea caused him to question the privileged position within modern anthropology given to the notion of 'descent'. He found that there were cases where siblingship was more important in New Guinean people's lives than 'descent'. It is clear from his writings that his fieldwork experiences led him to look for other ways of properly characterising his ethnographic data. Casting various forms of  'descent' as  modalities of 'vertical' arrangement (as derived from general structuring principles), he sought to accommodate the 'horizontal' relationships found in New Guinean social life.  In his 1974 article he was able to conclude that "The narrow and often shaky criterion of descent is no longer useful or required, nor is it logically defensible. It can be superseded by the criteria of vertical and horizontal arrangement ..." (Pouwer, 1974:251-252)

Structuralism and Semiotics

Pouwer's intellectual approach to social structure followed that of Claude Lévi-Strauss and stood in contrast to the naive empiricism of Radcliffe-Brown. Pouwer, in keeping with a sense of 'becoming' imminent in life, also developed the notion of 'structuration'.

It is noticeable in his later work that Pouwer does not follow Lévi-Strauss into a structuralist analysis of myth and ritual. In his 1975 article he distances himself from an examination of paradigmatic relations at the expense of syntagmatic movements. Pouwer pays homage in that work to a "Holy Trinity" of three levels of articulation: 1. symbolic (relationship between signifier and signified), 2. paradigmatic (relationship of one sign to another in its relative position to other signs in a system (limited)), 3. syntagmatic (chain of signs projected in a particular space, time and discourse (unlimited)). All three levels are to be respected.

"The paramount postulate is that things and events should be studied as if they were signs. The thing-analogy, a tacit postulate of so many studies of social facts and initiated by Durkheim, should be abandoned." (Pouwer 1975:97)

Structural History

Pouwer did not accept a division of labour between history and anthropology, although his history was one of configurations of structuring principles.

"... the history of the succession of varying configurations of structuring principles in their dialectical interaction with the stream of signified events, has barely begun ..." (Pouwer 1974:253)

Reciprocity

Reciprocity formed a chapter of Pouwer's PhD thesis (1955:161-211). The special place of reciprocity in his work stems from  Marcel Mauss, author of "The Gift" (1925), who has been cast as an 'ancestor' of Leiden structural anthropology as well as from the work of Claude Lévi-Strauss (making use of the same source). Pouwer found reciprocity to be a striking feature of New Guinean life and wrote about aopao (Kamoro - reciprocity) as a total social fact covering all aspects of Mimika culture. (Pouwer 1975:86; 2002:30;2010:11-13)

Like New Guinean peoples, the notion of reciprocity (and the lack of it) provided Pouwer with a means of comparing aspects of life across socio-cultural boundaries.

Selected bibliography
Brief dd. 6 December 1953 aan het Hoofd van het Kantoor voor Bevolkingszaken te Hollandia, betreffende: de benutting der tweedeling voor de ontwikkeling van der Mimika, Archives Bureau of Native Affairs No. 508, The Hague.

Enkele aspecten van de Mimika-cultuur (Nederlands Zuidwest Nieuw Guinea). Proefschrift Rijksuniversiteit Leiden, 26 October 1955 (supervisor J.P.B. de Josselin de Jong). 's-Gravenhage: Staatsdrukkerij- en Uitgeversbedrijf. xii + 323 pp., maps, fig. English summary, 9 pp. 1955

A Masquerade in Mimika. Antiquity and Survival 1(5):373-386 1956

'Loosely' Structured Societies in Netherlands New Guinea. Bijdragen tot de Taal-, Land-en Volkenkunde, 116, 109-118. 1960

New Guinea as a Field for Ethnological Study: A Preliminary Analysis.  Bijdragen tot de Taal-, Land- en Volkenkinde 117 (1961), No: 1, Leiden, 1-24

A Social System in the Star Mountains: Towards a Reorientation of Study of Social Systems.American Anthropologist LXI No 4 133-162 (Special publication). 1964

Radcliffe-Brown's Ideas on Joking Relationships Tested by Data from Mimika. International Archives of Ethnography 1:11-30 1964

Towards a Configurational Approach to Society and Culture in New Guinea. Journal of the Polynesian Society 75-3:267-86 1966

Toward a Configurational Approach to Society and Culture in New Guinea. Behavioral Science Research in New Guinea: a report of a conference. Honolulu, Hawaii August 18–25, 1965 Publication 1493 National Research Council Academy of Sciences Washington D.C 1967:77-100 (This is an earlier version of the preceding and is available via Google books.)

Translation at Sight: The Job of a Social Anthropologist. Inaugural Address, The Victoria University of Wellington (New Zealand-Aotearoa) 1 August 1968.

Mimika Land Tenure New Guinea Research Bulletin 38:24-33 Canberra: Australian National University 1970

Signification and Fieldwork. Journal of Symbolic Anthropology 1:1-13 1973 (based on Translation at sight)

The Structural Configurational Approach: A Methodological Outline. in: Rossi 1974:238-255

Structural History: A New Guinea Case Study. in W.E.A. van Beek and J.H. Scherer (eds) 1975:80-111

The Anthropologist as the Trickster's Apprentice: Complementarity Ambivalence and Dialectic.  Typescript n.d.(c 1979?)

The Enigma of the Unfinished Male: An Entry to East Bird's Head Mythology, Irian Jaya Anthropos (Journal) 94:457-486.

Geslachtelijheid en ideologie: toegelicht aan een samenleving van Irian Jaya in T. Lemaire (ed.) 1984

Cargo Cult as Countervailing Ideology. Bijdragen tot de Taal-, Land- en Volkenkunde 144:523-539 1988

 The Leiden Structuralist Tradition: A "French Connection"? Antropologische Verkenningen 8:21-34. 1989

The Individual Re-visited. In: Borsboom, et al 1989:291-307

The Willed and the Wild: The Kalam Cassowary Revisited. In Man and a Half: Essays in Pacific Anthropology and Ethnobiology in Honour of Ralph Bulmer. A. Pawley (ed). Auckland: Polynesian Society. No. 48:305-316. 1991

Mimika in Terence E. Hays (ed.) 1991:209

The Hidden Flow (review of James Weiner, The Heart of the pearl shell: The mythological dimension of Foi sociology. 1988 Uni of California Press) Bijdragen tot de Taal-, Land- en Volkenkinde 147:502-508 1991

Fizzy: Fuzzy; FAS? A Review of Leiden Labour. Canberra Anthropology 15(1) 1992:87-105

The colonisation, decolonisation and recolonisation of West New Guinea. Journal of Pacific History Vol. 34, No. 2:157-79 1999

We-Humans' Betwixt and Between: A Guide to the Stories in G.A.M Offenberg and Jan Pouwer 2002

Kamoro life and ritual. in D. Smidt (ed.) 2003:24-57

Gender, Ritual and Social Formation in West Papua: A Configurational Analysis Comparing Kamoro and Asmat. Leiden: KITLV Press (KITLV, Verhandelingen 258). xiii + 300 pp. ill. maps. 2010.

Reference Bibliography

Beek, W.E.A. van and Scherer, J.H. (eds) Explorations in the Anthropology of Religion: Essays in Honour of Jan van Baal. The Hague: Nijhoff (KITLV, Verhandelingen 74). 1975

Borsboom, A.; Kommers, J.; Remie, C. (eds) Liber amicorum A.A. Trouwborst: Antropologische essays. Nijmegen: Katholieke Universiteit Nijmegen, Instituut voor Culturele en Sociale Antropologie; 1989 Sociaal Antropologische Cahiers; v. XXIII

Grijp, Paul van der, Ton Lemaire en Albert Trouwborst (eds) Sporen in de antropologie: Liber Amicorum Jan Pouwer. Nijmegen: Katholieke Universiteit Nijmegen, Instituut voor Kulturele en Sociale Antropologie 1987, 330 pp.

Hays, Terence E. Encyclopedia of World Cultures, Volume 2:Oceania Boston:Hall

Haenen, Paul and Pouwer, Jan (eds) Peoples on the Move: Current Themes of Anthropological Research in New Guinea. Nijmegen: Centre for Australian and Oceanic Studies, University of Nijmegen 1989

Kooijman, Simon, Jan Pouwer en de ‘Leidse’ Mimika collectie. In: Paul van der Grijp et al 1987, pp. 107–118.

Knauft, Bruce M. South Coast New Guinea Cultures: History, Comparison, Dialectic. Cambridge: Cambridge University Press. 1993

Lemaire, T (ed.) Anthropologie en ideologie. Groningen: Konstapel 1984

Offenberg, Gertrudis A.M and Pouwer, Jan (eds) Amoko in the Beginning: Myths and Legends of the Asmat and Mimika Papuans. Adelaide: Crawford House Publishing (Australia) 2002

Oosten, Jarich "A Privileged Field of Study:" Marcel Mauss and Structural Anthropology in Leiden. Etudes/Inuit/Studies, 2006, 30(2):51-71

Ploeg, Anton Pouwer's Field Research in the Star Mountains, West New Guinea Oceania, Vol. 83, Issue 1 (2013): 49–56

Rossi, Ino (ed) The Unconscious in Culture: The Structuralism of Claude Lévi-Strauss in Perspective. New York: Dutton, 1974

Schefold, Reimar. Cultural Anthropology, Future Tasks for Bijdragen, and the Indonesian Field of Anthropological study. Bijdragen tot de Taal-, Land- en Volkenkunde, 150 Volumes of Bijdragen: A Backward Glance and a Forward Glimpse 150(4):805-825. 1994

Smidt, D (ed) Kamoro Art: Tradition and Innovation in a New Guinea Culture. KIT, Amsterdam, Rijksmuseum voor Volkenkunde, Leiden 2003

See also
Kamoro language

References

External links
 Short obituary with two photos of Jan Pouwer
An Annotated Bibliography for the Kamoro People contains a comprehensive listing of Pouwer's writing in relation to Kamoro people. rich text format download. www.papuaweb.org/bib/abib/kamoro.rtf 
 Comparative functionalism - Walter Goldschmidt 

1924 births
2010 deaths
Dutch anthropologists
Explorers of New Guinea
Leiden University alumni
Academic staff of the University of Amsterdam
Academic staff of the Victoria University of Wellington
Academic staff of Radboud University Nijmegen
Scientists from Dordrecht
Dutch expatriates in Indonesia